Mong may refer to:

People
A proposed original name for the Hmong people, based on the main group, the Mong community
Bob Mong, American journalist and academic administrator
Henry Mong, American surgeon and Presbyterian missionary
Mong Monichariya, Cambodian judge
Mong Thongdee (born ), Thai origami artist
William Mong (1927–2010), Hong Kong businessman
William V. Mong (1875–1940), American film actor, screenwriter and director
MC Mong, stage name of South Korean hip hop artist Shin Dong-hyun (born 1979)

Places
Mong, Punjab, a town and Union Council in Pakistan
Mong, Azad Kashmir, a town in Kashmir, Pakistan
Mong Circle, a hereditary chiefdom in Bangladesh

Other uses
 Mong or Hmong language
 Mong, the ISO 15924 code for Mongolian script